Emerson Hugh De Lacy (May 9, 1910 – August 19, 1986) was an American politician and socialist. He served on the Seattle City Council from 1937 to 1940 and as a member of the United States House of Representatives from 1945 to 1947. He represented the First Congressional District of Washington as a Democrat.

Early years
De Lacy was born in Seattle, Washington, and educated in the public schools of the Queen Anne section of Seattle. He graduated from the University of Washington with a master of arts degree in 1932.

Career
From 1933 to 1937, De Lacy taught English at the University of Washington.

De Lacy was elected to the Seattle City Council in 1937. He was subsequently elected as president of the Washington Commonwealth Federation, a left-wing faction within the Washington State Democratic Party that included a number of members of the Communist Party USA. He was re-elected and served on Seattle City Council until 1940.

According to historian of American Communism Harvey Klehr, De Lacy was a secret member of the Communist Party USA at the time of his 1937 election.

De Lacy's party membership was first publicly revealed  by the former Executive Secretary of the Washington Commonwealth Federation, Howard Costigan, who declared in sworn testimony delivered to the House Un-American Activities Committee in 1954 that he had sat with De Lacy on the governing bureau of the Seattle district of the CPUSA from 1937 to 1939.

De Lacy was elected to the United States Congress in 1944, replacing fellow Democrat Warren G. Magnuson who had retired from the House to run (successfully) for United States Senate. De Lacy was defeated by Republican Homer Jones in the 1946 election.

In 1947, De Lacy became editor of the Bulletin of the Machinists' Union in Seattle. From 1948 to 1950, he was state director of the Progressive Party of Ohio. He became a carpenter in 1951, and in 1960 he became a general building contractor. He retired from that role in 1967.

DeLacy and his Washington Commonwealth Federation held monthly community fundraisers they called hootenannies. They introduced folk singers Woody Guthrie, and Pete Seeger to the word when they came to visit Seattle in 1941, who went on to popularize it as term for a folk music jam.

Personal life
On October 24, 1947, De Lacy was divorced from Betty De Lacy. In 1949, De Lacy married actress Hester Sondergaard.

Death
On August 19, 1986, De Lacy died in Soquel, California.

References

External links

 Hugh DeLacy papers. 1938-1985. 4.87 cubic feet (11 boxes, 1 map tube, 1 package). At the Labor Archives of Washington, University of Washington Libraries Special Collections.

 Hugh De Lacy and the Washington Commonwealth Federation, from Strikes! Labor History Encyclopedia for the Pacific Northwest.

1910 births
1986 deaths
20th-century American politicians
American carpenters
Democratic Party members of the United States House of Representatives from Washington (state)
Machinists
Members of the Communist Party USA
People from Los Angeles
Progressive Party (United States, 1948) politicians
Seattle City Council members
University of Washington faculty
University of Washington alumni
American socialists
American Marxists
Washington (state) socialists